"Rockafella" is the first single found on Redman's second album, Dare Iz a Darkside. It is produced by Redman and contains samples from "I Wanna Do Something Freaky to You" by Leon Haywood and "Flashlight" by Parliament. It can be found on the compilation, Hip Hop Factory: The Bomb Hip Hop, Vol. 1. The song is dedicated to the memory of rapper Rockafella.

Chart positions

#62 (Hot R&B/Hip-Hop Singles & Tracks)
#10 (Hot Rap Singles)
#3 (Hot Dance Music/Maxi-Singles Sales)

Single track list

A-Side
 Rockafella (LP Version) (4:43)
 Rockafella (LP Instrumental) (4:01)

B-Side
 Rockafella (Remix Version) (4:43)
 Rockafella (Remix Instrumental) (4:44)

References

1995 singles
Redman (rapper) songs
Def Jam Recordings singles
Funk-rap songs
Songs written by Leon Haywood
Songs written by George Clinton (funk musician)
1994 songs
Songs written by Redman (rapper)
Songs written by Bootsy Collins
Songs written by Bernie Worrell